The Wrong Birds is a 1914 American silent short drama film starring Edith Borella, Charlotte Burton, George Field, and Ed Coxen.

Cast 

 Edward Coxen as Dick Wayne - the Groom (as Ed Coxen)
 Charlotte Burton as Dorothy Dean - the Bride
 George Field as Squire Hopper - the Sheriff
 Edith Borella as Nell Jackson
 William Tedmarsh as Jim Thomas

External links

1914 films
1914 drama films
American silent short films
American black-and-white films
1914 short films
Silent American drama films
1910s American films
1910s English-language films
American drama short films